The Felixstowe F.3 was a British First World War flying boat, successor to the Felixstowe F.2 designed by Lieutenant Commander John Cyril Porte RN at the naval air station, Felixstowe.

Design and development
In February 1917, the first prototype of the Felixstowe F.3 was flown.  This was a larger and heavier development of the Felixstowe F.2A, powered by two 320 hp (239 kW) Sunbeam Cossack engines. Large orders followed, with the production aircraft powered by Rolls-Royce Eagles.  The F.3's larger size gave it greater range and a heavier bombload than the F2, but poorer speed and agility.  Approximately 100 Felixstowe F.3s were produced before the end of the war, including 18 built by the Dockyard Constructional Unit at Malta.

Operational history
The larger F.3, which was less popular with its crews than the more maneuverable F.2A, served in the Mediterranean as well as the North Sea.

In 1920, the Canadian Air Board sponsored a project to conduct the first-ever Trans-Canada flight to determine the feasibility of such flights for future air mail and passenger service. The leg from Rivière du Loup to Winnipeg was flown by Lieutenant Colonel Leckie and Major  Hobbs in a Felixstowe F.3. Six F.3s served with the Canadian Air Force/Air Board between 1921 and 1923.

On the 22 March 1921, a Felixstowe F.3 flying boat of the Portuguese Naval Aviation – crewed by the naval aviators Sacadura Cabral and Ortins de Bettencourt, naval navigator Gago Coutinho and aviation mechanic Roger Soubiran – performed the first flight between Mainland Portugal and Madeira.

Operators

 Tasmania – two for commercial use, carrying six passengers or a ton (2,240 lb) of freight

Canadian Air Board

Portuguese Naval Aviation

Aeronáutica Naval España
Spanish seaplane carrier Dédalo – three carried

Royal Naval Air Service
 Royal Air Force
No. 232 Squadron RAF
No. 234 Squadron RAF
No. 238 Squadron RAF
No. 249 Squadron RAF
No. 261 Squadron RAF
No. 263 Squadron RAF
No. 265 Squadron RAF
No. 267 Squadron RAF
No. 269 Squadron RAF
No. 270 Squadron RAF
No. 271 Squadron RAF

United States Navy

Specifications (F.3)

See also
Canadian Vickers – Felixstowe F-III built for transatlantic attempt

References

Further reading

 Thetford, Owen. British Naval Aircraft since 1912. London: Putnam, Fourth edition, 1978. .

External links

The First Trans-Canada Flight: Photographs including the Felixstowe F.3 flown by Leckie and Hobbs during October 1920 and their stop in Selkirk, Manitoba.
Fire Fighting with Aeroplanes: Film showing the use of flying boats, including a Felixstowe F.3 (G-CYBT) and seaplanes to help prevent forest fires in Algonquin Provincial Park, Ontario, Canada, c.1922.
In the Wake of Captain Cook: Canadian Government Motion Picture Bureau film of a visit by F.3 flying boat (G-CYDI) to Nootka Sound on Vancouver Island, Canada, c.1922.
Felixstowe Flying-Boats

1910s British patrol aircraft
Flying boats
F.3
Biplanes
Aircraft first flown in 1917
Twin piston-engined tractor aircraft